General  Sawar Khan   سوار خان, NI(M) is an ex-four-star general of the Pakistan Army who was the Governor of the largest province, Punjab and the Vice Chief of Army Staff during the era of General Muhammad Zia-ul-Haq, when Zia was simultaneously the Chief of Army Staff (Pakistan) and the President of Pakistan.

Military career
Sawar Khan was commissioned before the independence of Pakistan in 1947 into the Indian Army's Corps of Artillery. He later opted for Pakistan Army in 1947. As a captain, Sawar became the Instructor Gunnery (IG) at the Artillery School.

General Officer
He was promoted to Lt General on 24 March 1976 by General Zia-ul-Haq after he became the Chief of Army Staff superseding five other generals. Sawar Khan who at the time was serving as Adjutant General (AG) at the GHQ was sent as the Commander XI Corps, Peshawar, where he replaced the recently superseded Lt Gen Majeed Malik. He continued to serve in Peshawar until January 1978 when he was replaced by Lt Gen Fazle Haq. In 1978, Lt Gen Sawar Khan moved to Lahore to take over IV Corps as its Corps Commander. He took over from Lt Gen Iqbal Khan who proceeded as the Vice Chief of the Army Staff (VOAS), a newly created post.

Martial Law Administrator of Punjab
When Zia imposed martial law, the then Lt Gen Sawar Khan was sent as the governor of Punjab province in 1978, in addition to his responsibilities as Commander IV Corps, Lahore. He was part of small coterie of generals under General Zia ul-Haq, who determined the national security policies in the martial regime. The other generals were Lt Gen Faiz Ali Chishti (Commander X Corps, Rawalpindi), Lt Gen Jehanzeb Arbab (Governor of Sindh and Commander V Corps, Karachi), Lt Gen Iqbal Khan (CJCSC), and the other military governors of Khyber-Pakhtunkhwa and Balochistan Fazle Haq and Rahimuddin Khan.

After two-year stint, he was replaced with Lt Gen Ghulam Jilani Khan and promoted to four-star general.

After two-year stint, he was replaced with Lt Gen Ghulam Jilani Khan and promoted to four-star general.

Vice Chief of Army Staff
In March 1980, when the post of the deputy chief of army staff (created by Zia-ul-Haq) was redefined and re-designated as the Vice Chief of Army Staff, General Sawar replaced Lt Gen Iqbal Khan. General Sawar was replaced by the Zia's deputy General Khalid Mahmud Arif in March 1984 after completing the four-year term. Sawar was a professional soldier and hailed from the Potohar plateau of north Punjab, which had been a traditional recruitment area for the British and the Pakistani armies.

Awards and decorations

Foreign Decorations

References

See also
Gang of Four in Pakistan Army

 

|-

 

1924 births
Year of death missing
Punjabi people
Pakistan Military Academy alumni
Pakistan Army Artillery Corps officers
Pakistani generals
Pakistani military personnel of the Indo-Pakistani War of 1971
Military government of Pakistan (1977–1988)
Governors of Punjab, Pakistan
Recipients of Nishan-e-Imtiaz
Pakistani academic administrators